Robin Soudek (born July 31, 1991) is a Czech professional ice hockey player. He is currently playing with VEU Feldkirch in the Alps Hockey League (AlpsHL).

Playing career
Soudek played in his youth with HC České Budějovice before he was drafted 12 overall in the 2008 CHL import draft by the Edmonton Oil Kings of the Western Hockey League. Undrafted after his junior career with the Oil Kings, Chilliwack Bruins and Victoria Royals, Soudek returned to his original club, České Budějovice, in his native Czech Republic. During the 2012–13 season, he appeared in just 11 games for his first professional season.

With a lack of playing time, Soudek was prompted to return to North America and accepted an invite to the Lake Erie Monsters training camp for the 2013–14 season. Unable to earn a contract, Soudek was reassigned to CHL affiliate, the Denver Cutthroats to begin the year. On February 12, 2014, Soudek earned a recall to the Monsters, scoring in his first AHL game in a 5-4 shootout victory over the Oklahoma City Barons on February 15, before later returning to help the Cutthroats reach the Ray Miron Cup finals.

On September 3, 2014, Soudek as a free agent signed a one-year standard player contract with the Stockton Thunder of the ECHL. In the 2014–15 season, Soudek scored 4 goals and 6 points in 9 games with the Thunder before he was traded to the Rapid City Rush on November 9, 2014.

On July 20, 2015, Soudek opted to return to his native country, agreeing to a try-out contract with HC Olomouc of the Czech Extraliga. He was later released without an offer of a contract.

Career statistics

Regular season and playoffs

International

References

External links

1991 births
Living people
Chilliwack Bruins players
Czech ice hockey forwards
Dauphins d'Épinal players
Denver Cutthroats players
Diables Rouges de Briançon players
Edmonton Oil Kings players
ETC Crimmitschau players
Evansville IceMen players
Motor České Budějovice players
Lake Erie Monsters players
Sportspeople from České Budějovice
Rapid City Rush players
Stockton Thunder players
Victoria Royals players
Czech expatriate sportspeople in Austria
Expatriate ice hockey players in Austria
Czech expatriate sportspeople in France
Expatriate ice hockey players in France
Czech expatriate ice hockey players in Germany
Czech expatriate ice hockey players in Canada
Czech expatriate ice hockey players in the United States